The Sink-Crumb Post No. 72 American Legion Hut is a historic American Legion hall at Second and Cherry Streets in Knobel, Arkansas.  It is a single-story cypress log structure, with a corrugated tin roof, a Rustic form that was typical of Legion halls of the 1930s.  The hall was built in 1933–34 with funding from the Federal Civil Works Administration for the local American Legion chapter, which had been founded in 1931, and has served as a center for its activities since then.

The building was listed on the National Register of Historic Places in 2008.

See also
National Register of Historic Places listings in Clay County, Arkansas

References

Clubhouses on the National Register of Historic Places in Arkansas
Cultural infrastructure completed in 1934
American Legion buildings
National Register of Historic Places in Clay County, Arkansas
1934 establishments in Arkansas
Civil Works Administration
Log buildings and structures on the National Register of Historic Places in Arkansas